Century College is a two-year community college and technical college in White Bear Lake, Minnesota. It is a member of the Minnesota State system. It was founded in 1967 as Lakewood State Junior College and in 1996 merged with Northeast Metro Technical College to become Century College.

Overview
One of Minnesota's largest and most diverse two-year community and technical colleges, Century College serves over 11,500 credit students each year. 41% are students of color. 55% of Century College students are 18-24 years old, 34% are 25 or older, and 11% are high school students. 45% are first-generation students. 

Century College is accredited by the Higher Learning Commission.

Degrees and programs
Century College offers over 160 degrees, diplomas, and certificates in a wide variety of areas, including applied design, arts and humanities, business, health sciences, human services, science, technology, engineering and mathematics (STEM), social and behavioral sciences, and trade and industry.

Continuing Education and Customized Training (CECT) at Century College offers non-credit courses for entry-level careers, professional development and customized training. CECT program areas include business, career and leadership, computers and office productivity, health and human services, public safety, motorcycle training, project and resource management, and trade and industry.

Student activities
Century College offers 30+ student clubs, organizations, and activities available in areas such as fine and performing arts, recreation, and career development. Century College athletics teams include men's baseball and women's volleyball and they belong to the National Junior College Athletic Association (NJCAA) and Region XIII.

References

External links
http://www.century.edu/

Two-year colleges in the United States
Educational institutions established in 1967
Universities and colleges in Ramsey County, Minnesota
1967 establishments in Minnesota
Community colleges in Minnesota